Paul Rothrock (born January 9, 1999) is an American soccer player for the Tacoma Defiance in MLS Next Pro.

Early life
Born and raised in Seattle, Rothrock  spent most of his youth career with Seattle United, a partner club of the Seattle Sounders Academy, leading them to two Washington State Cup titles, two Far West Regional titles, and two appearances in the U.S. Youth Soccer national finals. In his U18 season, he joined the Sounders Academy, helping the squad to a third-place finish in the USSDA National Playoffs.

Rothrock attended Lakeside School in Seattle, where he was a two-time all-state player and tallied 43 career assists.

College career
On February 2, 2017, it was announced that Rothrock signed a letter of intent to play college soccer at the University of Notre Dame.

After the 2018 NCAA Division I men's soccer season, Rothrock transferred to Georgetown. He had his first assist for Georgetown on August 30, 2019, in a 3–1 victory against Syracuse. He scored his first goal in a 5–1 win against UCLA on September 9, 2019.

Club career
He made his debut for USL club Seattle Sounders FC 2 on July 8 and scored his first goal in a 4–1 defeat to Real Monarchs.

During his 2019 season, Rothrock played with National Premier Soccer League side OSA Seattle FC, making 3 appearances.

He was drafted in the third round of the 2021 MLS SuperDraft by Toronto FC. On May 18, he signed with their second team, Toronto FC II of USL League One. He made his debut for TFCII on May 26 against FC Tucson. He scored his first goal on October 1 against North Carolina FC. On October 17, he scored a brace in a 2–1 victory against Chattanooga Red Wolves SC. On May 4, 2022, he signed a short-term four-day loan with the first team, Toronto FC, ahead of their Major League Soccer match against the FC Cincinnati. He signed an additional four-day loan on May 7. He made his MLS debut on May 8, as a late game substitute. He signed another short-term loan on May 14.

In January 2023, he signed the Tacoma Defiance (who he previously played for in 2017 when they were known as Seattle Sounders 2) in MLS Next Pro.

International career
In 2017, he was called up to a national team camp for the United States U18 team, making one appearance for them.

Career statistics

References

External links 
 Paul Rothrock at Georgetown Athletics

1999 births
Living people
American soccer players
Georgetown Hoyas men's soccer players
Notre Dame Fighting Irish men's soccer players
Tacoma Defiance players
Association football midfielders
Soccer players from Seattle
USL Championship players
National Premier Soccer League players
Toronto FC draft picks
Toronto FC II players
MLS Next Pro players
USL League One players